Madonna: The Celebration Tour is the upcoming twelfth concert tour by American singer Madonna. Hyped as the biggest production the singer has ever done, featuring music from every era of her career, it is scheduled to begin on July 15, 2023, at the Rogers Arena in Vancouver, Canada, and is set to conclude on January 20, 2024, at the Footprint Center in Phoenix, United States, visiting cities in North America and Europe throughout 79 dates. As Madonna's first retrospective tour, it highlights her 40-plus years of recording career.

The tour was announced on social media on January 17, 2023, after major speculation. To accompany its announcement, Madonna shared a Truth or Dare inspired, star-studded promo video featuring industry colleagues Diplo, Judd Apatow, Jack Black, Lil Wayne, Bob the Drag Queen, Kate Berlant, Larry Owens, Megan Stalter, Eric André, and Amy Schumer. A Live Nation pre-sale  took place on January 19 at 10:00 a.m. local, prior to the public on-sale beginning January 20 via Ticketmaster.

Background and development 
Earliest speculations of a Madonna tour started after the release of her remix/compilation album Finally Enough Love: 50 Number Ones, when outlets in Latin America reported a Madonna reservation of Estadio Centenario in Uruguay in October 2022. On January 4, 2023, British tabloid The Sun and other media outlets started reporting about a rumored tour celebrating her 40-plus recording career. Rumors were fueled after Madonna wiped or hid her Instagram posts on January 16. The tour was formally announced on January 17 on Madonna's official website and social media channels. In her statement, Madonna said: "I am excited to explore as many songs as possible, in hopes to give my fans the show they have been waiting for". On January 24,  Variety reported that as a result of the development and production of the show, Madonna's biopic, which she was directing and co-writing, had been shelved.

The Celebration Tour marks two unprecedented facts in Madonna's career: the first is that this is her first time touring without promoting a specific studio album; the second is that the tour set list will exclusively focus on her greatest hits. BBC music correspondent Mark Savage suggested that her Re-Invention World Tour (2004) was her closest or first formal greatest hits tour, claiming that the set list largely ignored her then-current album, American Life — although six of the album's 11 tracks were performed nightly.

Set list
Upon the announcement, on January 18, 2023, Billboard dedicated a list of potential songs across the four decades they would like to hear, as well as creating a poll for fans to comment on what song they would like to see be performed. On 20 January 2023, the poll showed the 1987 single "Causing a Commotion" as the leading contender. Publications such as Rolling Stone, Consequence and Variety also elaborated their dream setlist.

Building off the excitement of week's announcement, Madonna turned directly to her fanbase as she builds out her Celebration Tour setlist, asking her fans "What song would you like to dance to at my show?" on her social platforms.

Commercial performance

Presale
Originally a 35-date tour following the initial announcement, several new dates were added due to overwhelming demand on January 19, with second shows in Seattle, Chicago, Toronto, Montreal, Boston, Miami, Houston, Dallas, Austin, Los Angeles, San Francisco and Las Vegas along with a third show in New York City. A second date was also added in London. On the same day, more than 90% of hotels around London's O2 Arena were booked up for Madonna's concerts.

General sale
On the day of the general sale, January 20, additional second dates were added in Amsterdam, Antwerp, Barcelona and Milan, along with a third date in Paris and two extra dates in London due to popular demand. Over 200,000 fans queued to buy tickets for the London dates, and nearly 30,000 people were waiting in the digital queue in Netherlands according to Algemeen Nederlands Persbureau (ANP). Ticketmaster's website in Spain crashed for moments. According to Billboard, over 600,000 tickets were sold that day. Despite numerous reports that tickets for the tour were some of the most expensive ever for any artist, shows across North America and Europe experienced "extraordinary demand" and sold out in record time, prompting Madonna's team to add several new dates in both continents. On that date, the first three New York City shows sold out under 15 minutes, the first two London dates within 20 minutes, Paris shows under seven minutes, and her Amsterdam date sold out in 10 minutes.

On January 23, second dates in Copenhagen, Cologne and Berlin were announced. On the same day, a second show was added in Lisbon due to very high demand despite tickets for the show being the most expensive for any concert tour in Portugal's history. Around the same time, Madonna herself posted a short video on her official platforms such as Instagram and TikTok, thanking her fans for their "love and support".

On January 26, after the four shows in London had sold out, a fifth concert, to be held at the O2 Arena in December 2023, was announced due to "sensational demand" for tickets by British fans. Later that day, due to continued demand new dates were also added in Brooklyn and Inglewood bringing the total number of shows in each of New York City and Greater Los Angeles to six. On the following day, a fourth and final concert in Paris was announced as well.  On January 30, due to continued "extraordinary demand", a sixth show at the O2 Arena in London, to be held on 6 December 2023, was announced.

On March 14, 2023, due to continued strong demand, seven additional shows were added in the United States including second dates in Phoenix and Washington, D.C., and third shows in San Francisco and Las Vegas. First shows in Palm Springs, Sacramento, and Philadelphia were announced as well.

Shows

References

External links 
Madonna.com > Tour

Madonna concert tours
2023 concert tours
Concert tours of North America
Concert tours of the United States
Concert tours of Canada
Concert tours of Spain
Concert tours of Europe
2024 concert tours